The Bell of King Seongdeok is a large bronze bell, the largest extant bell in Korea. The full Korean name means "Sacred (or Divine) Bell of King Seongdeok the Great." It was also known as the Emille Bell, after a legend about its casting, and as the Bell of Bongdeoksa Temple, where it was first housed.

The bell was commissioned by King Gyeongdeok to honor his father, King Seongdeok. However, King Gyeongdeok never lived to see the casting of the bell, as he died in 765 A.D. The bell was finally cast in 771 A.D., during the reign of Gyeongdeok's son, King Hyegong.

Now stored in the National Museum of Gyeongju, the bell was designated as the 29th national treasure of Korea on December 12, 1962. The Gyeongju National Museum weighed it in 1997, and found that its weight was 18.9 tons.

Artistic characteristics

The bell is considered a masterpiece of Unified Silla art. It is unique among Korean bronze bells because of the presence of delicate designs and the title text, written in an elegant literary language. The whole structure, including its decorative elements, produces a wide range of sound frequencies; the sound tube absorbs high frequency waves, contributing to a distinctive beat.

The hook of the bell is in the shape of a dragon's head. There are many relief patterns on the bell, including flower patterns along the rim and shoulder. There are also reliefs of lotus flowers, grass, and a pair of two apsaras (heavenly maidens). The striking point of the bell (dangjwa) is also in the shape of a lotus and sits between two of the apsara reliefs. The bottom of the bell is in a rhombic shape, designed to augment the sound reverberation. 

The inscriptions on the bell (the title text), over a thousand hanja, are a fine example of Korean calligraphy and carving. They provide detailed information about the bell and why it was cast.

The column the bell hangs on is quite firm. Even a column of the same diameter, made of a modern alloy, might bend under the weight of the bell, yet the bell still hangs on an ancient column that has lasted for several centuries.

Legend
The bell is commonly known as the Emile Bell in both Korean and English. Emile, pronounced "em-ee-leh," is an ancient Silla term for "mommy".

According to legend, the first bell that was cast produced no sound when it was struck. The bell was recast many times but with no success. The king that had wanted the bell cast died after a while and his young son took over with the help of the queen. The son carried out what his father had started but still he didn't have any success. Later, a monk dreamed that if a child was cast into the metal, the bell would ring. The monk then took a child from the village and had her cast into the metal. When the bell was complete, the bell made the most beautiful sound when struck.

Some, however, believe the legend may actually be a modern invention, and that the story and name originated in the 1920s. A story that was published about the "Eomilne bell" or "Earmilne bell" (어밀네 종) may have been distorted in retelling. The most recent argument is that legend about other bell became confused with the legend of the Emile bell.

See also
Korean Bell of Friendship
Bell of Yongjusa

References

Further reading

External links
Cultural Heritage Administration

King Seongdeok
National Treasures of South Korea
Silla
Buildings and structures in Gyeongju
Korean art
Tourist attractions in Gyeongju
8th-century works
771
8th century in Korea